Carabus hummeli tristiculus is a subspecies of ground beetle in the subfamily Carabinae that is endemic to Russia, where it can only be found in Maritime province. The species are bluish-black coloured.

References

hummeli tristiculus
Beetles described in 1879
Endemic fauna of Primorsky Krai